Princess Teri'i-na-vaha-roa (8 August 1879 – 27 April 1917) was the last sovereign monarch of the Kingdom of Huahine and Mai'ao from 1893 to 1895. Comteporary sources seems to call her Tehaapapa II instead, disregarding the ruling queen by the same name at the time James Cook visited the island.

Biography
Te-ha'apapa III was a member of a royal Tahitian dynasty, the deposed royal family Teururai of Huahine.

As a Tahitian Princess, she became Queen of Huahine. 

She was the last Queen of Huahine from 1893 to 1895. She was the eldest daughter of Marama Teururai, prince regent of Huahine by his wife Tetuanuimarama a Te-u-ru-ari'i, Princess of Rurutu. 

She was crowned with the regnal name Te-ha'apapa III in 1893, and was deposed when Huahine was annexed by the French in September 1895.

Marriage
She married first at Fare on 15 May 1895 (divorced 6 August 1897) to His Highness Teri'i-te-vae-a-ra'i-a-Mai, a descendant of Ma'i, the Princely House of Bora Bora and secondly on 1900 to a native minor noble man called Tini-tua a Tu-ari'i-hi'o-noa . 

She had one son by her first husband and eleven other natural children through a morganatic union with Tinitua-a-Tu-Ari'i-hi-ona.

She died at Fare, 27 April 1917.

Ancestry

See also
French Polynesia
Annexation of the Leeward Islands
List of monarchs who lost their thrones in the 19th century

External links and sources
 
 Jean-François BARE, Tahiti, les temps et les pouvoirs. Pour une anthropologie historique du Tahiti post-européen, Paris, ORSTOM, 543 p.
  Eugène HANNI, Trois ans chez les Canaques. Odyssée d'un Neuchâtelois autour du monde. Lausanne, Payot & C° Éditeurs, 342p.,
 Teuira Henry, Tahiti aux temps anciens (traduction française de Bertrand Jaunez, Pars, Musée de l'Homme, Société des Océanistes, 671p. (édition originale Ancient Tahiti, Honolulu 1928)
  Bruno SAURA, La lignée royale des Tamatoa de Ra'iatea (îles Sous-le-Vent), Papeete, ministère de la Culture, 229 p.
 Bruno SAURA, Huahine aux temps anciens, Cahiers du Patrimoine [Savoirs et traditions] et Tradition orale, édition 2006.
 Raoul TEISSIER, Chefs et notables au temps du protectorat: 1842 - 1880, Société des Études Océaniennes, réédition de 1996.

Family

References 

1879 births
1917 deaths
19th-century women rulers
Huahine royalty

Queens regnant in Oceania
19th-century monarchs in Oceania